Year 156 (CLVI) was a leap year starting on Wednesday (link will display the full calendar) of the Julian calendar. At the time, it was known as the Year of the Consulship of Silvanus and Augurinus (or, less frequently, year 909 Ab urbe condita). The denomination 156 for this year has been used since the early medieval period, when the Anno Domini calendar era became the prevalent method in Europe for naming years.

Events 
 By place 
 America 
 The La Mojarra Stela 1 is produced in Mesoamerica.

 By topic 
 Religion 
 The heresiarch Montanus first appears in Ardaban (Mysia).

Births 
 Dong Zhao, Chinese official and minister (d. 236)
 Ling of Han, Chinese emperor of the Han Dynasty (d. 189)
 Pontianus of Spoleto, Christian martyr and saint (d. 175)
 Zhang Zhao, Chinese general and politician (d. 236)
 Zhu Zhi, Chinese general and politician (d. 224)

Deaths 
 Marcus Gavius Maximus, Roman praetorian prefect
 Zhang Daoling, Chinese Taoist master (b. AD 34)

References 

 

als:150er#156